Sparsh Shah is an American rapper, singer, songwriter and inspirational speaker from New Jersey, US. He was born in 2003 in Iselin, New Jersey, to a family of Indian descent.

Sparsh has a very rare disorder Osteogenesis Imperfecta, also known as  Brittle Bone Disorder. He had over 35 broken bones in his body at the time of birth. As of 2020, he has suffered from 125 fractures.

He has also been a motivational speaker, aiming to changing many lives through his music and speech. He was featured in World's Greatest Motivators, Little Big Shots and Kaun Banega Crorepati. He is known for his viral cover video of Eminem's "Not Afraid" song. A documentary film Brittle Bone Rapper was made on his journey.

He had visited India in 2019 and had an interview with Republic TV journalist Arnab Goswami. Sparsh Shah sang the Indian National Anthem in the Howdy, Modi! event the same year.

Pro
 'Not Afraid Viral Cover song - 2016
 'TEDx Talks''' - 2017
 'The Maury Show' - 2017
 'Kaun Banega Crorepati Season 10 Finale - 2018
 '''Little Big Shots' - 2018

Awards
 Global Indian Award 2018

References

External links
Sparsh Shah on YouTube

Living people
Motivational speakers
Year of birth missing (living people)